Studenci (sometimes Studence) is a former village in eastern Slovenia in the Municipality of Trebnje. It is now part of the village of Dolenja Dobrava. It is part of the traditional region of Lower Carniola and is now included in the Southeast Slovenia Statistical Region.

Geography
Studenci lies south of the village center of Dolenja Dobrava. Studence Hill stands above the settlement to the north. It is connected by road to Jezero to the northwest and Poljane pri Mirni Peči to the east.

Name
The name Studenci literally means 'springs', and it and similar forms (e.g., Studenec, Studeno) are relatively common toponyms for places in Slovenia associated with springs. It is derived from Slavic *studenьcь '(walled) spring', from the adjective *studenъ 'cold'.

History
Studenci was deemed annexed by Dolenja Dobrava in 1953, ending any existence it had as a separate settlement.

References

External links
 Studenci on Geopedia

Populated places in the Municipality of Trebnje
Former settlements in Slovenia